Rada is a feminine given name which may refer to:

 Rada Akbar (born 1988), Afghan-born visual artist, and photographer
 Rada Borić (born 1951), Croatian scholar, feminist and women's rights activist
 Rada Manojlović (born 1985), Serbian pop folk singer
 Rada Owen (born 1978), American swimming coach and former swimmer
 Rada Rassimov (born 1938), Italian actress
 Rada Vidović (born 1979), Serbian former basketball player
 Rada Vranješević (1918–1944), Yugoslav political activist and World War II resistance leader

Feminine given names